Manarat el Mostaqbal Language School is a school located in Moqattam, Cairo, Egypt.

References

External links 
 

Private schools in Cairo